Roland George Lyall Paver (born 4 April 1950) is a South African former first-class cricketer.

Paver was born at Johannesburg. He was educated in the city at The Ridge School, before going up as a Rhodes Scholar to Pembroke College at the University of Oxford. While studying at Oxford, he played first-class cricket for Oxford University, making his debut against Essex at Oxford in 1972. He played first-class cricket for Oxford until 1972, making sixteen appearances, two of which included playing in The University Matches against Cambridge in 1973 and 1974. Playing as a wicket-keeper, he scored 290 runs at an average of 12.08 and a high score of 34, while behind the stumps he took 33 catches and made five stumpings. In addition to playing first-class cricket for the university, Paver also appeared in four List A one-day matches for Oxford in the 1973 Benson & Hedges Cup. Paver later emigrated to Australia, where he lives in Albany, Western Australia.

References

External links

1950 births
Living people
Cricketers from Johannesburg
South African Rhodes Scholars
Alumni of Pembroke College, Oxford
English cricketers
Oxford University cricketers
South African emigrants to Australia